Richard Kidder Meade, Jr. (July 29, 1803 – April 20, 1862) was Virginia lawyer, plantation owner and politician who served in the Virginia Senate and in the United States House of Representatives, as well as U.S. minister to Brazil under President James Buchanan before returning to Virginia to work for the Confederate States of America during the American Civil War until his death.

Early and family life
Meade was born near Frederick County, Virginia, the son of Mary Fitzhugh Grymes Randolph and her husband Richard Kidder Meade (1746–1805) who had served as an aide-de-camp to General Washington. His grandfather was David Meade of Nansemond County and his paternal grandmother Susana Everard was the daughter of North Carolina's governor. His brother William Meade remained in Frederick county and became the Episcopal bishop of Virginia. He had private tutors and also studied law. He married Julia Edmunds Haskins (d. 1891) in Petersburg, Virginia on November 3, 1825, and their children included Susan Meade Bolling (-1861), Richard Kidder Meeade (1835–1862) and Hugh Everard Meade (1838–1862), as well as daughters Indiana (1826-1898), Julia (b. 1831), Mary (b. 1839)and Marion (b. 1842) and son David (1845–1929).

Career
He was admitted to the bar and commenced practice in Petersburg, Virginia. He also became a plantation owner in St. Andrews Parish, Brunswick County, Virginia near Lawrenceville. In the 1820 U.S. Census, this Richard Kidder Meade owned 55 enslaved persons, and his household also included 16 free white persons. In the 1830 U.S. Federal Census, he owned 43 enslaved persons and his household included three other white persons. The 1840 U.S. Census for Dinwiddie County, Virginia shows his household as including 10 white persons and 15 enslaved persons. The earlier censuses do not list the names of family members. The 1860 U.S. Federal Census lists him as living in Petersburg's south ward with many family members. His personal estate at the time is $7000 along with $20,000 in real estate, so</ref> By 1836, Meade invested in the Brunswick Land Company, which invested and speculated in Texas.

In 1836, he was elected to the State Senate, where he represented Brunswick, Dinwiddie and Greensville Counties from 1835–1838. He replaced George C. Dromgoole, who had won election to the U.S. Congress.

When Congressman Dromgoole died, Meade was elected as a Democrat to the Thirtieth Congress to fill the vacancy. Voters of Virginia's 2nd congressional district reelected him to the Thirty-first and Thirty-second Congresses. He served from August 5, 1847, to March 3, 1853. His seat was taken by John Singleton Millson. Meade declined President Pierce's offer as charge d'affairs to Sardinia in 1853.

He became a strong supported of President James Buchanan, who rewarded him by appointing him Minister to Brazil. After confirmation by the U.S. Senate, served from July 27, 1857, to July 9, 1861. He was replaced by James Watson Webb.

Upon the election of President Abraham Lincoln, Meade returned to Virginia and devoted himself to the cause of the Confederacy. His older sons also volunteered as Confederates.

Death and legacy
Richard Kidder Meade died in Petersburg, Virginia, on April 20, 1862. He was interred in Old Blandford Cemetery. Although his widow survived him by decades and his youngest son may have lived, both his older sons, Maj. Richard Kidder Meade Jr. and  Hugh Everard Meade, who had been sent home after falling ill in confederate camps, died within four months of their father.

Electoral history

1847; Meade was elected to the U.S. House of Representatives with 53.91% of the vote, defeating Whig George W. Bolling
1849; Meade was re-elected with 88.67% of the vote, defeating Whig S.J. Weisigner and Independent identified only as Shell.
1851; Meade was re-elected unopposed.

Sources

1803 births
1862 deaths
Virginia lawyers
19th-century American diplomats
Democratic Party members of the United States House of Representatives from Virginia
19th-century American lawyers
People from Lawrenceville, Virginia
19th-century American politicians
People from Frederick County, Virginia
Meade family of Virginia